Bernard Caron (born 11 August 1952) is a French professional football manager and former player. He was most recently joint-manager of Régional 2 club FC Villeneuve-sur-Lot. As a player, he was a centre-back.

Honours 
Nancy
 Coupe de France: 1977–78

Notes

References

External links 
 
 

1952 births
Living people
Sportspeople from Pas-de-Calais
French footballers
French football managers
Association football central defenders
SU Agen Football players
CS Sedan Ardennes players
AS Nancy Lorraine players
Paris FC players
Paris Saint-Germain F.C. players
FC Rouen players
Périgueux Foot players
Ligue 2 players
Ligue 1 players
French Division 3 (1971–1993) players
French Division 4 (1978–1993) players
Association football player-managers
France youth international footballers
France under-21 international footballers
France B international footballers
Footballers from Hauts-de-France